Radničko Sportsko Društvo Sloboda,, commonly abbreviated as RSD Sloboda Tuzla, is a multi-sport club based in Tuzla, Bosnia and Herzegovina. Sloboda is mostly male sports society, its female counterpart is Jedinstvo Tuzla.

History
Society was founded in 1927, but its first and base member football club was founded in 1919. Society was founded so to organize the existing sports clubs in Tuzla. Sloboda has 13 different sports teams and one musical section.

Clubs
There are 14 competitive clubs that are part of RSD Sloboda.

Famous athletes

Olympic athletes

 1 Won silver medal
 2 Won golden medal

Other athletes

 Mirza Teletović, basketball
 Damir Mršić, basketball
 Jasmin Hukić, basketball
 Mirza Begić, basketball
 Elmedin Kikanović, basketball
 Mustafa Hukić, football
 Asim Pars, basketball
 Alen Ovčina, handball
 Nedžad Verlašević, football
 Fahrudin Omerović, football
 Said Husejinović, football 
 Muhamed Konjić, football
 Mirsad Dedić, football
 Rizah Mešković, football
 Mirza Mešić, football
 Mesud Nalić, football

References

External links
www.sdsloboda.ba

Sport in Tuzla
1927 establishments in Bosnia and Herzegovina
Sports organizations established in 1927
Multi-sport clubs in Bosnia and Herzegovina
Sports teams in Bosnia and Herzegovina